The 2021 Nicholls State Colonels football team represented Nicholls State University as a member of the Southland Conference during the 2021 NCAA Division I FCS football season. Led by seventh-year head coach Tim Rebowe, the Colonels compiled an overall record of 6–5 with a mark of 5–3 in conference play, placing third in the Southland. Nicholls State played home games at John L. Guidry Stadium in Thibodaux, Louisiana.

Previous season

The Colonels finished the 2020 season with a 4–3 record, 3–3 in Southland play, during the shortened season due to the COVID-19 pandemic. As Nicholls decided to play during the scheduled FCS season in the spring, their schedule only consisted of FCS teams, including all teams who chose to play in the spring from the Southland, and Lincoln (MO). They concluded the season ranked No. 23 in the STATS poll and No. 20 in the FCS Coaches poll.

Preseason

Preseason poll
The Southland Conference released their preseason poll in July 2021. The Colonels were picked to finish second in the conference. In addition, eleven Colonels were chosen to the Preseason All-Southland Team.

Preseason All–Southland Teams

Offense

1st Team
David Mosley – Tight End/Halfback, SR
Dai'Jean Dixon – Wide Receiver, SR
P. J. Burkhalter – Offensive Lineman, SR
Jair Joseph – Offensive Lineman, SR
Evan Roussel – Offensive Lineman, SO

2nd Team
Julien Gums – Running Back, SR
KJ Franklin – Wide Receiver, JR

Defense

1st Team
Kevin Moore III – Defensive Back, SR

2nd Team
Perry Ganci – Defensive Lineman, SO
Hayden Shaheen – Linebacker, FR
Dontaze Costly – Kick Returner, SR

Personnel

Schedule

Game summaries

at Memphis

at Louisiana

North Alabama

Houston Baptist

No. 14 Southeastern Louisiana

at No. 18 Incarnate Word

at Houston Baptist

Northwestern State

at McNeese State

No. 17 Incarnate Word

at No. 15 Southeastern Louisiana

References

Nicholls
Nicholls Colonels football seasons
Nicholls Colonels football